The R501 is a Regional Route in South Africa that connects Carletonville with Viljoenskroon via Potchefstroom.

Route
It begins at a junction with the N12 National Route in Gauteng province (south-west of Westonaria), just west of the N12's intersection with the R28. It goes west for 19 kilometres and the first town it comes to is Carletonville, where it intersects with the R500 just south of the Carletonville city centre.

After bypassing the town centre, it continues westwards to meet the south-western terminus of the R559. Just after, it crosses into the North West province, and gradually turns into a more southerly direction, bypassing the Boskop Dam, to reach Potchefstroom to the south-west.

In Potchefstroom, it enters as Thabo Mbeki Drive and reaches a junction with the R53 (Albert Luthuli Drive). The R501 and R53 become one road eastwards on Albert Luthuli Avenue, then southwards on Govan Mbeki Avenue, before the R53 leaves Govan Mbeki Avenue and becomes its own road eastwards in the town centre. Just after, by Mooirivier Mall, the R501 meets the N12 National Route for the 2nd time.

It leaves the city in a south-south-westerly direction, initially following the Mooi River. It proceeds to cross the Vaal River into the Free State at the Scandinavia Drift and end at an intersection with the R59 north of Viljoenskroon.

References

Regional Routes in the Free State (province)
Regional Routes in Gauteng
Regional Routes in North West (South African province)